Sanya River (Chinese: 三亚河) is located in the southern part of Hainan Province, China. It runs from the Shuiyaunchi Reservoir south through Sanya where it discharges into Sanya Bay.

References

External links 

Rivers of Hainan